Ipswich Town Football Club currently runs a Category Two Academy, with a five-year plan to improve to Category One, which is run by Bryan Klug. The youth teams play their home games at the Ipswich Town Training Centre at Playford Road in Ipswich, Suffolk, while some home games are played at Portman Road.

Some of Ipswich's greatest ever players have come through the club's youth system since the 1960s, including Roger Osborne, Mick Mills, Kevin Beattie, Russell Osman, George Burley, John Wark, Terry Butcher and Jason Dozzell. The academy was also very successful during the 1990s, producing a number of first-team players including Richard Wright, Titus Bramble, James Scowcroft and Kieron Dyer.  More recently, players such as Connor Wickham, who became the youngest Ipswich player to ever play for the first-team, making his debut at 16 years and 11 days old and Andre Dozzell, son of Jason Dozzell, who like his father went on to score in his debut for the club at the age of 16, have both graduated from the academy.

Under-21s squad

Out on loan

Under-18s squad

Academy coaching staff

Notable academy players 
The following is a list of players who have played in the Ipswich Town youth system and gone on to make 3 or more senior appearances at Championship level or above or the top league of that country. Players who are currently playing for the club are highlighted in bold. Players who never made a senior appearance for the club are in italics.

 Colin Harper
 Mick Mills
 Derek Jefferson
 Geoff Hammond
 Laurie Sivell
 Brian Talbot
 Kevin Beattie
 Eric Gates
 Robin Turner
 George Burley
 Tommy Parkin
 John Wark
 Les Tibbott
 Russell Osman
 Alan Brazil
 Terry Butcher
 Gary Stevens
 Kevin Steggles
 Steve McCall
 Mich d'Avray
 Colin Clarke 
 Ian Cranson
 Jason Dozzell
 Frank Yallop
 Mark Brennan
 Jon Hallworth
 Tony Humes
 Dalian Atkinson
 Craig Forrest
 Mick Stockwell
 Chris Kiwomya
 David Gregory
 Richard Hall 
 Gavin Johnson
 Neil Gregory
 Adam Tanner
 Tony Vaughan
 Matthew Upson
 Richard Wright
 James Scowcroft
 Richard Naylor
 Keiron Dyer
 Wayne Brown
 Titus Bramble
 Scott Loach
 Arran Lee-Barrett
 Darren Bent
 Darren Ambrose
 Matt Bloomfield
 Matt Richards
 Ian Westlake
 Dean Bowditch
 Richard Keogh
 Lewis Price
 Scott Barron
 Chris Whelpdale
 Josh Simpson
 Owen Garvan
 Shane Supple
 Danny Haynes
 Billy Clarke
 Chris Casement
 Liam Trotter
 Ed Upson
 Ryan Bennett
 Morgan Fox
 Jordan Rhodes
 Stuart O'Keefe
 Tommy Smith
 Nick Pope
 Connor Wickham
 Jack Ainsley
 Macauley Bonne
 Tom Eastman
 Luke Hyam
 Ronan Murray
 Josh Carson
 Caolan Lavery
 Cody Cropper
 Jack Marriott
 Teddy Bishop
 Matt Clarke
 Harry Clarke
 Josh Emmanuel
 Myles Kenlock
 Andre Dozzell
 Flynn Downes
 Tristan Nydam
 Luke Woolfenden
 Ben Folami
 Jack Lankester
 Idris El Mizouni
 Liam Gibbs
 Tyreece Simpson

Academy Player of the Year

Youth honours

Reserves/Under-21s 
The Football Combination
Champions (4): 1972–73, 1975–76, 2006–07 (East Division), 2007–08 (East Division)
FA Premier Reserve League South Division
Champions (1): 2001–02
Professional Development League South Division
Champions (1): 2018–19, 2021–22

Academy

League 
U17 FA Premier Academy League
Champions (1): 2000–01

Cups 
FA Youth Cup
Winners (3): 1972–73, 1974–75, 2004–05
Professional Development League CupWinners (1): 2021–22Suffolk Premier CupWinners (5):''' 1967–68, 1968–69, 1969–70, 2006–07, 2009–10

Notes

References

External links 
 Ipswich Town Academy official site
 The Blues Foundation

Under-21s and Academy
Football academies in England